Last of the Great Pretenders is the eighth studio album by American singer-songwriter Matt Nathanson. It was released on July 16, 2013. Last of the Great Pretenders is Nathanson's third album for Vanguard Records, following his 2007 album Some Mad Hope and 2011 album Modern Love. He released the first single, "Mission Bells", as a free download to his fan mailing list in March 2013. Last of the Great Pretenders debuted on number 16 on the Billboard 200 for the week of July 29, 2013.

Track listing

Personnel 

Musicians
 Matt Nathanson - Primary Artist, Lead & Background Vocals, Acoustic & Electric Guitar
 Aaron Tap - Acoustic & Electric Guitar, Background Vocals
 Victor Indrizzo - Drums 
 Chris Reynolds - Drums, Engineer, Synthesizer 
 Jake Sinclair - Bass, Drums, Guitar, Mixing, Producer, Programming, Vocals (Background) 
 Mike Viola - Bass, Guitar, Keyboards, Producer, Vocals (Background)

Charts

References

External links 
 mattnathanson.com

Matt Nathanson albums
2013 albums
Vanguard Records albums